Campbells Creek may refer to:
Campbells Creek, Victoria, a town in Victoria, Australia
Campbells Creek (West Virginia), a stream